Jetboil manufactures and markets lightweight gas-fueled portable stoves used primarily for backpacking.

The company was formed in 2001 by Dwight Aspinwall and Perry Dowst in a former woolen mill in Guild, New Hampshire, debuting its products at the 2003 Outdoor Retailers trade show. In 2006 the company moved its headquarters to Manchester, New Hampshire and in 2012 was purchased by Racine, Wisconsin-based Johnson Outdoors.

Stove design
Stoves feature a neoprene-insulated pot (billycan), corrugated metal heat exchanger (burner) and burner adjustment valve — with ignition via either an outside source or integral push-button electric igniter, depending on the model.

The ring of corrugated metal forming the burner also shields it from wind and directs heat to the base of the pot. The ring and burner, along with a coiled heat exchanger at the bottom of the stove all work to contain heat, enabling an average boiling time of two minutes and fifteen seconds.

The company markets its fuel, a mixture of propane and isobutane, in canisters that thread to the bottom of the burner. Several stove models feature a stabilizing tripod (for the base of the fuel canister) as well as a plastic cup, which covers the heat exchanger during storage.

Models

Jetboil has marketed a range of stoves that vary in construction materials and features, with more expensive models offering lighter weight and decreased cooking times:
 
 Personal Cooking System (2004) weight (425 grams), boil time: 4 minutes. 
 Group Cooking System (2006), 1.6 liter pot, boil time: 5:00. 
 Helios, group cooking system (2008–2014), replaced by Joule.
 Flash (2009), offered in different colours, boil time: 2.25 minutes.
 Zip (2011), 0.8 liter aluminum cup, adjustable burner, no ignitor,  weight 9.5 ounces, boil time 2.5 minutes.
 Sol TI (2011) titanium cup, weight 5.3 ounces includes pressure regulator boil time: 1.75 minutes, lightest model.
 Sol Advanced (2011), aluminum cup, push-button igniter, weight 10.5 ounces, integral pressure regulator, boil time 2:00.
 Sumo Al (2012) aluminum cup, three bowls with lids, orange in color, reversible sleeve, self-storing.
 Joule (2013), 2.5 liter pot, uses liquid-feed butane, stove base and pot, no accessories. weight 27.6 ounces. 
 MiniMo (2014), 1 liter pot, flame control valve, weight 14.6 ounces.
 Flash 2.0 (2018). Boil time 1 minute 40 seconds.

Accessories  include a lightweight coffee press, replacement lids, mesh strainers, support and stabilizer kit, pots and pans, utensils and plastic plates, and a tool for puncturing holes in used fuel canisters prior to recycling.

See also
 Billycan
 Johnson Outdoors
 Portable stove

References

External links 
 Jetboil Flash review

Camping equipment manufacturers
Companies based in Manchester, New Hampshire
Companies established in 2001
Portable stove manufacturers